Hemis National Park is a high-elevation national park in Ladakh, India. Globally famous for its snow leopards, it is believed to have the highest density of them in any protected area in the world. It is the only national park in India that is north of the Himalayas, the largest notified protected area in India (largest National park) and is the second largest contiguous protected area, after the Nanda Devi Biosphere Reserve and surrounding protected areas. The park is home to a number of species of endangered mammals, including the snow leopard. Hemis National Park is India's protected area inside the Palearctic realm, outside the Changthang Wildlife Sanctuary northeast of Hemis, and the proposed Tso Lhamo Cold Desert Conservation Area in North Sikkim.

The park is bounded on the north by the banks of the Indus River, and includes the catchments of Markha, Sumdah and Rumbak, and parts of the Zanskar Range.

History

Geography and ecological significance
The park lies within the Karakoram-West Tibetan Plateau alpine steppe ecoregion, and contains pine forests, alpine shrublands and meadows, and alpine tundra vegetation.

Fauna
The park is home to a viable breeding population of about 200 snow leopards, especially in the Rumbak catchment area. The prey base for the apex predator in the Central Asian Highlands is primarily supported in Hemis by Argali (Great Tibetan Sheep), Bharal (Blue Sheep), Shapu (Ladakhi Urial), and livestock. A small population of the Asiatic ibex is also present in Hemis.  Hemis is the only refuge in India containing the Shapu.

The Tibetan wolf, the Eurasian brown bear (endangered in India), and the red fox are also present in Hemis. Small mammals include the Himalayan marmot, mountain weasel and the Himalayan mouse hare.

Among birds of prey noted here are Himalayan and Trans-Himalayan birds of prey: the golden eagle, lammergeier vulture, and Himalayan griffon vulture. The Rumbak Valley offers opportunities for birdwatching, including several Tibetan species not common in other parts of India. Birds present here include brown accentor, robin accentor, Tickell's leaf warbler, streaked rosefinch, black-winged snowfinch, chukar, Blyth's swift, red-billed chough, Himalayan snowcock, and the fire-fronted serin.

16 mammal species and 73 bird species have been recorded in the park so far.

Flora

This region is in the rain shadow of the Himalayas, and does not receive much precipitation. Hence, dry forests of juniper, Populus - Salix forests, subalpine dry birch - fir are present at lower elevations. Alpine and steppe trees are predominantly found here. These trees and shrubs are spread across the valley bottoms. Since the upper mountain slopes are moist, this area is characterized by alpine vegetation including Anemone, Gentiana, Thalictrum, Lloydia, Veronica, Delphinum, Carex and Kobresia. The other parts of the park support steppe vegetation which is dominated by Caragana, Artemisia, Stachys, and Ephedra, present along the lower river courses. A study conducted by CP Kala reports 15 rare and endangered medicinal plants growing in the park, which include Acantholimon lycopodioides, Arnebia euchroma, Artemisia maritima, Bergenia stracheyi, Ephedra gerardiana, Ferula jaeschkeana, and Hyoscyamus niger.

Environmental issues
Over 1,600 people live inside the park boundaries, mostly pastoralists raising poultry, goats, and sheep. This results in considerable animal-human conflict within the region. Snow leopards prey on livestock, sometimes killing several animals from a single flock in one hunt. This has been attributed to the overgrazing of livestock. Crop damage caused by bharal has also been seen.

The Department of Wildlife Protection, Government of Jammu and Kashmir is the custodian of the park. Any activity in the park is prohibited unless special permission is obtained from the Chief Wildlife Warden J&K. The department has initiated many projects for biodiversity conservation and rural livelihood improvement in Ladakh, including the Hemis National Park, such as:
 Project Snow Leopard for Conserving the entire Himalayan biosphere. The project was initiated by the department in 2004 and was formally launched on 20 February 2009.
 Ladakh Eco tourism Project
 Ladakh Home stays: A program for providing tourists with access to home stays in local villagers' residences (source of additional income).
 Nature Guide Training for the educated unemployed youth.
 Eco Cafe for the women Help Group to run the cafe and sell the local handicraft products to the tourist.
 Creation of a no-grazing zone for domestic livestock
 Predator-proofing livestock pens in the area

Tourism

The park offers a number of routes for trekking from mid-June to mid-October; some of these trekking routes are among the most popular in Ladakh. This includes the Markha valley trek and the trek from Spituk to Stok over the Ganda La pass. The Hemis National Park is also famous for mountaineering expeditions. The Stok Kangri peak (6,153 metres (20,187 ft)) and the Kang Yatse peak (elevation 6,496 metres (21,312 ft)) are the two mountains which attract the highest number of climbers every year. The park has also become popular among tourists who want to observe the snow leopard. The best season for spotting snow leopards is in late winter. The historic Hemis Monastery is home to the Hemis Festival (Hemis Tsechu) every summer. Lodging is restricted to backcountry camps, villager homestays and accommodation at the monasteries.

 Nearest railhead: Kalka, Haryana
 Nearest highway: Leh-Manali Highway, and National Highway 1D (Srinagar - Kargil - Leh), both near the northern borders of the park
 Nearest town: There are quite a few villages, and gompas (monasteries) inside the national park

Checkposts at the park boundaries 
There is no metalled road in Hemis National Park. However, a few rough roads enable local people to reach their villages. There is a rough road connecting Chilling bridge to Skiu village in the Markha valley and another one connecting Spituk to Zingchen and Rumbak village. On Hemis side, there is a road connecting Martselang to Shang Sumdo.

In order to protect the national park and its tourism-related activities (trekking, homestays, wildlife spotting), the in inhabitants of the region demanded in 2018 a regulation of vehicle access to the park. Since 2019, ALTOA (All Ladakh Tour Operator Association) and the Department of Wildlife Protection have set up checkposts at each entrance of the Hemis National Park. These checkposts are located at Chilling (at the bridge crossing the Zanskar river), at Zingchen, and at Shang Sumdo. Beyond these checkposts, only motorized vehicles used by villagers who live inside the park are allowed. Tourists are not allowed to use motorized vehicles inside the park, they shall walk. Tourists also need to pay a fee (called “wildlife fee”) when entering the park.

Ganda La

It lies within the Hemis National Park. and connects the Markha valley villages to Leh, and is regularly used by local people. The summer pass is open from June, and the winter pass (half kilometre north-west of summer pass) is open from late April.

The Markha Valley trek crosses the pass on the section between Rumbak and Skiu villages, which is usually done over 2 days. The other pass on the trek is the Gongmaru La (Kongmaru La).

Gallery

In culture
The park houses numerous Tibetan gompas and holy chortens within its boundaries. These include the famous 400-year-old Hemis Monastery. Hemis was a destination and via point on the silk routes of Tibet. Over 1,600 people live inside the park presently, with a large number of tourists and pilgrims visiting during the Hemis Tsechu festival.

The 400-year-old Hemis Monastery has long been a place of pilgrimage for Tibetan Buddhists. However, in the late 19th and early 20th century, the monastery attracted some attention due to the writings of Nicolas Notovitch, a Russian aristocrat and journalist, who claimed that Jesus had spent the missing years of his life in Tibet and Ladakh, specifically in Hemis. (see Lost years of Jesus)

The national park, monastery and the Changthang Wildlife Sanctuary were prominently featured in the award-winning documentary Riding Solo to the Top of the World.

See also

 Karakorum Wildlife Sanctuary
 Changthang Cold Desert Wildlife Sanctuary

References

Bibliography
 Management Plan Hemis High Altitude National Park, Jigmet Takpa IFS and Saleem Ul Haq.
Hemis High Altitude National Park-Government of Jammu and Kashmir, Department of Wildlife Protection, Wildlife Division(LAHDC) Leh-Ladakh
 Chettri, Nakul.  2003.
 Namgail, T., Fox, J.L. & Bhatnagar, Y.V. (2004). Habitat segregation between sympatric Tibetan argali Ovis ammon hodgsoni and blue sheep Pseudois nayaur in the Indian Trans-Himalaya. Journal of Zoology (London), 262: 57-63.
 Ladakh: The Land and the People, By Prem Singh Jina. Published by Indus Publishing, 1996,

National parks in Ladakh
Protected areas established in 1981
Tourism in Ladakh
Geography of Ladakh
1981 establishments in Jammu and Kashmir